Leucocoprinus scissus is a species of mushroom producing fungus in the family Agaricaceae.

Taxonomy 
It was described in 2021 by the mycologists Alfredo Justo, Angelini Claudio and Alberto Bizzi who classified it as Leucocoprinus scissus.

Description 
Leucocoprinus scissus is a small dapperling mushroom with thin whitish flesh.

Cap: 1-4cm wide starting conical-campanulate before expanding to conical to flat with a slight umbo. The surface is white with small, scattered brownish-ochre scales that surround the umbo and become more sparse towards the cap margins. The margins are striated almost to the centre of the cap but are fragile and prone to splitting at maturity. Gills: Free, white and moderately crowded, with a bulge in the middle (ventricose). Stem: 2.5-6cm wide and 2.5-4mm thick. It is cylindrical with a slight clavate taper up from the base which is up to 6mm thick. The surface is smooth and whitish above the stem ring and ochre-yellow below with the colour becoming more intense towards the base, where white threadlike (filiform) rhizomorphs may be present. The membranous stem ring is small and white but is easily removed and may sometimes be missing. Spores: Ovoid to ellipsoid, without a germ pore. Dextrinoid and metachromatic. (5.5) 6-8 (8.5) x 4-6 (6.5) μm. Smell: Indistinct.

Etymology 
The specific epithet scissus is Latin for torn or split. This is in reference to the tendency for the edges of the cap to split at maturity.

Habitat and distribution 
The species was discovered in the Dominican Republic were it was found growing gregariously on leaf litter in deciduous woodland in November.

References 

scissus
Fungi described in 2021
Fungi of the Caribbean